Remo Bodei (3 August 1938 – 7 November 2019) was an Italian philosopher. He was a professor of the history of philosophy at the UCLA University, Los Angeles California, and also had taught at the University of Pisa and Scuola Normale Superiore di Pisa.

Bodei was born in Cagliari. His initial interests were in classical German philosophy, and the Weimar Classicism period (1770–1830). He subsequently penned over 200 papers on utopian thinkers of the eighteenth and nineteenth centuries, and contemporary political thought. He died in Pisa, aged 81.
He has been member of the Contemporary Centre of Arts founded by Menotti Lerro.
He won the Cilento Poetry Prize for criticism in 2020 (posthumous).

Works

His books include the following volumes:

Sistema ed epoca in Hegel (Bologna, Il Mulino, 1975. Reprinted 2014 with the title La civetta e la talpa. Sistema ed epoca in Hegel)
Hegel e Weber. Egemonia e legittimazione (Bari, De Donato, 1977) (with Franco Cassano)
Multiversum. Tempo e storia in Ernst Bloch (Napoli, Bibliopolis, 1979), 1983 (new edition) 
Scomposizioni. Forme dell'individuo moderno (Turin, Einaudi, 1987. Reprinted by Il Mulino, Bologna, 2016)
Hölderlin: la filosofia y lo tragico (Madrid, Visor, 1990)
Ordo amoris. Conflitti terreni e felicità celeste (Bologna, Il Mulino, 1991)
Geometria delle passioni. Paura, speranza e felicità: filosofia e uso politico (Milano, Feltrinelli, 1991)
Le forme del bello (Bologna, Il Mulino, 1995)
Le prix de la liberté (Paris, Éditions du Cerf, 1995)
Se la storia ha un senso (Bergamo, Moretti & Vitali, 1997)
La filosofia nel Novecento (Roma, Donzelli, 1997)

References

External links
Remo Bodei nell'Enciclopdia Treccani
 Interview with Remo Bodei, Barcelona Metropolis, 2008.
 

1938 births
2019 deaths
20th-century Italian philosophers
21st-century Italian philosophers
Historians of philosophy
University of California, Los Angeles alumni
Academic staff of the University of Pisa
Scuola Normale Superiore di Pisa alumni
People from Cagliari